Neocyema erythrosoma is a species of pelagic fish, a deep-water bobtail snipe eel in the family Cyematidae.  It is the only member of its genus, Neocyema. It was first described by Peter Castle in 1978 after two specimens were caught at great depths in the south Atlantic Ocean in 1971. Further specimens have since been caught in the North Atlantic.

Description
It is laterally compressed and has a long narrow snout with delicate, fine-boned jaws and small teeth. The eyes are also small and the whole fish is a bright orange-red colour. Muscle bands known as myomeres can be seen through the transparent skin. The skeleton lacks a number of bones that are found in other ray-finned fish; there is no opercular bones or pectoral girdle and only a single branchial arch.

Distribution
The locations of these two further finds were the first for the species in the North Atlantic and were both areas in which hundreds of research trawls had been made previously. The fact that the species had not been caught at an earlier date demonstrates its great rarity.

Larval form
In 1909, Schmidt described a larval form of an eel that had been found in the northeast Atlantic and named it Leptocephalus holti. In 1974, Raju described a similar larval eel from the Pacific Ocean. Both resembled the larva of the bobtail snipe eel Cyema atrum but were morphologically distinct from it. The larvae were transparent and laterally compressed with very long snouts, large eyes, fewer than five intestinal loops and a pattern of lateral pigmentation. The identity of the adult form of these larvae was unknown at the time. After the description of Neocyema erythrosoma in 1978, it was hypothesized that Leptocephalus holti might be its larval form.

In 1996, Smith and Miller reconsidered this matter in the light of 47 other specimens of Leptocephalus holti available to them, mostly from the North Atlantic. They determined that there were three species groups among the larvae and that many of the specimens lacked pigmentation. With the discovery of Neocyema erythrosoma in the Northern Atlantic the distance barrier was also overcome and they considered that there was little doubt that Leptocephalus holti was indeed the larval form of Neocyema erythrosoma.

References

Cyematidae
Monotypic fish genera